Heli Järvinen (born 31 May 1963) is a Finnish politician for the Green League, representing the Southern Savonia constituency from 2007 to 2011 and the Southeastern Finland constituency since 2015. She was elected to the Finnish Parliament in the parliamentary election of March 2007. She lost her seat in the Parliament of Finland in 2011 elections but was again elected in 2015. She was also a member of the municipal council of Kerimäki between 2005 and 2011. Since 2017 she has been a member of Savonlinna town council. She is the second vice-chairperson of the council. 

Järvinen was born in Tampere. She has a master's degree in political science from the University of Tampere and has also graduated as a teacher of communications from the University of Jyväskylä. Prior to her election to the parliament she worked as a journalist and a teacher. Järvinen is married and has two children.

References

External links
Home page

1963 births
Living people
Politicians from Tampere
Green League politicians
Members of the Parliament of Finland (2007–11)
Members of the Parliament of Finland (2015–19)
Members of the Parliament of Finland (2019–23)
Women members of the Parliament of Finland
21st-century Finnish women politicians
University of Tampere alumni
University of Jyväskylä alumni